Infant sleep training refers to a number of different regimens to adjust a child's sleep behaviors.

The development of sleep over the first year

During the first year of life, infants spend most of their time sleeping. An infant can go through several sleep regressions starting at 1 week, which can occur weekly or fortnightly, until 8 years of age due to innate and external factors that contribute to sleep.

The long sustained sleep period (LSP) is the period of time that a child sleeps without awaking. The length of this period increases dramatically between the first and second months. Between the ages of three and twenty-one months, LSP plateaus, increasing on average only about 30 minutes. In contrast, a child's longest self-regulated sleep period (LSRSP) is the period of time where a child without sleep problems is able to self-initiate sleep without parental intervention upon waking. This means the child can fall asleep without the help of their parents. This self-regulation, also called self-soothing, allows the child to consistently use these skills during the nocturnal period. LSRSP dramatically increases in length over the first four months, plateaus, and then steadily increases at nine months. By about six months, most infants can sleep eight hours or more at night uninterrupted or without parental intervention upon awaking.

An infant from one to three months of age may sleep sixteen to eighteen hours a day in periods that last from three to four hours. By three months, the period of sleep lengthens to about four or five hours, with a decrease in the total sleep time to about fourteen or fifteen hours. At three months, they also start to sleep when it is dark and wake when it is light. There are two distinct napping periods: mid-morning and late afternoon. Finally, by six months the longest LSP is six hours and occurs during the night. There are two three-or-more hour naps with a total average sleep time of fourteen hours.

Though sleep is a primarily biological process, it can be treated as a behavior. Thus sleep can be altered and managed through practice and can be learned by the child, similarly how adults can alter and manipulate it. In Western European culture and elsewhere, these habits typically include sleeping in a crib (instead of a car seat, stroller, or swing), being put down to sleep when drowsy but awake, and avoiding negative sleep associations, such as nursing to sleep or using a pacifier to fall asleep.

Experts say that the ideal bedtime for an infant falls between 6 pm and 8 pm, with the ideal wake-up time falling between 6 am and 7 am. At four months of age, infants will typically take hour naps two to three times a day, with the third nap dropped by about nine months. By 9 months, their sleep patterns normalize naturally. By one year of age, the amount of sleep that most infants get nightly approximates to that of adults.

Good sleep conditions 
Sylvia Bell of Johns Hopkins University reported: by the end of the first year individual differences in crying reflect the history of maternal responsiveness rather than constitutional differences in infant irritability. She also notes: consistency and promptness of maternal response is associated with decline in frequency and duration of infant crying. When following through with this maternal response, Bell notes that it is most effective to apply physical contact with the infant.

The sleep position is also important to prevent Sudden Infant Death Syndrome (SIDS). It is recommended that the proper position for children to sleep in to avoid SIDS is laying on their back throughout the night. Their bedding should be firm and crib should be free from toys or blankets that could cause injury or suffocation to the child. Loose blankets and toys in the crib can increase the child’s risk of SIDS.

Controversies in sleep training

A key debate in sleep training revolves around getting the right balance between parental soothing and teaching the baby to self-soothe. Some parents who practice attachment parenting think the parent should attend to the baby whenever he or she cries. According to studies, sleep problems have been reported in 20 to 30 percent of infants, keeping parents awake. However, many popular sleep training methods, such as the Ferber Method, rely on letting the baby cry for a certain number of minutes, so that self-soothing skills are fostered instead of an over-reliance upon externally-provided soothing. The Ferber method has been criticized by some for being cruel. Developmental psychological research has demonstrated that emphasizing baby independence in the first year of life is correlated with insecure attachment, which leads to poor peer relations and more dependence later in childhood.

Another method is Behavioral Infant Sleep Intervention to effectively reduce infant sleep problems and associated maternal depression in the short- to medium-terms. This method randomized tried and found effective though concerns persist about long-term harm on children's emotional development and stress regulation, and the child-parent relationship. 

A few baby soothing techniques include bouncing and rocking the baby while sitting in a rocking chair, doing knee bends while holding them, doing comfort feeding, providing them with a pacifier, using white noise, swaddling them, skin-to-skin contact, and using a bouncer or swing to mechanically rock them.

One study shows that 80% of infants from Asian countries shared a room with their parents. These parents reported less overall sleep compared to the Caucasian countries where 50% of infants were reported to be sharing a room with their parents during the infants' first couple months of life.

Studies show that behavioral techniques promote efficient, healthy sleep patterns in infants who parents practice them. One study reported parents waking up in the night less and feeling more parental competence in the group that was taught these behavioral techniques.

Other influences on infant sleep 
A number of factors have been shown to be associated with problems in sleep consolidation, including a child's temperament, the degree to which they are breast-fed vs. bottle-fed, and their activities and sleepiness during the day.

Breastfeeding has been found to be associated with more waking at night than formula-fed infants because of the infant's ability to digest breast milk more quickly than formula. Breast-fed infants have been observed to begin sleeping through the night at a later age than formula-fed infants: formula-fed infants tend to begin sleeping through the night between 6–8 weeks, while breastfed infants may take until 17 weeks before sleeping through the night.

Consequences of unlearned sleep patterns 
Current knowledge demonstrates that infants who do not learn to self-regulate their sleep patterns encounter possible psychological and physical issues. Current literature reports "sleep problems in infancy are associated with perceived difficult infant temperament, increased likelihood of later behavior problems, compromised cognitive abilities, and increased body weight" (Wolfson, A.; Lacks, P.; Futterman, A (1992). Infant sleep problems are associated with more parental depression, stress, reduced quality of life, reduced physical health, and feelings of inadequacy (Wolfson, A.; Lacks, P.; Futterman, A (1992).

See also 
 The Ferber Method

References 

Parenting
Human development
Developmental psychology
Infancy
Sleep